Goseda Yoshimatsu (Japanese: , June 12, 1855 – September 4, 1915) was a Japanese painter mainly active in the Meiji era (1868–1912).

Biography 
In 1855, he was born in Edo, as a second son of  who was a Yōga painter. In 1865, he became Charles Wirgman's pupil. In 1874, he was employed at Imperial Japanese Army Academy as a picture teacher by recommendation of Kawakami Tōgai. In 1876, he entered  and became Antonio Fontanesi's pupil. In 1877, he left the school and won the Hōmon Prize in Yōga section of the first  with Abekawa Fuji Zu (阿部川富士図).

In 1880, he went to France and became Léon Bonnat's pupil. In 1882, his work was accepted for the Salon, a famous exhibition. He is the first Japanese painter who was accepted for the Salon. He participated in the First Sino-Japanese War. In 1915, he died in his own home in Yokohama.

Noted works

See also
 Takahashi Yuichi – Charles Wirgman's pupil
  – Goseda Yoshimatsu's pupil and husband of Goseda Hōriū's daughter

References 

 五姓田義松 suisai – 
  
 新書紹介『明治の宮廷画家―五姓田義松』
 五姓田義松 – kotobank

Yōga painters
Imperial Japanese Army Academy alumni
People from Musashi Province
Artists from Tokyo
1855 births
1915 deaths
19th-century Japanese painters
20th-century Japanese painters